Dhannalal Jain was an Indian politician from the state of Madhya Pradesh.
He represented the Dongargaon Vidhan Sabha constituency of the undivided Madhya Pradesh Legislative Assembly by winning the 1957 Madhya Pradesh Legislative Assembly election.

References 

People from Madhya Pradesh
Madhya Pradesh MLAs 1957–1962
Year of birth missing
Possibly living people
Place of birth missing
People from Rajnandgaon
Indian National Congress politicians from Madhya Pradesh